The Journal-Advocate is a daily newspaper in Sterling, Colorado. It is published by Prairie Mountain Publishing, which is owned by  MediaNews Group. MediaNews acquired it from Hollinger in 1996.

References

External links

Sterling/Logan County Chamber of Commerce website

Newspapers published in Colorado
Logan County, Colorado
Sterling, Colorado
Daily newspapers published in the United States